RG Capital Radio in the radio industry was an Australian radio company, formed in 1995 by Reg Grundy with the acquisition of 90.9 Sea FM. Between 1996 and 2000, the group grew to 28 stations across regional centres, and was subsequently floated on the Australian Securities Exchange, before its assets were sold to Macquarie Regional RadioWorks in 2004, and the network disbanded.

Stations
As of November 2000, RG Capital Radio operated 30 stations:

 2GO Central Coast
 3GG Warragul
 3SR FM Shepparton
 4GR Darling Downs
 4RO Central Queensland
 7AD Devonport
 7BU Burnie
 7LA Launceston
 Gold FM Gold Coast
 KOFM Newcastle (50% joint venture with Austereo)
 Magic 107 Hobart
 NXFM Newcastle (50% joint venture with Austereo)
 The River Albury/Wodonga
 Sun FM Shepparton

Mix FM
 Mix FM Sunshine Coast
 Mix FM Townsville
 Mix FM Wide Bay

Sea FM
 Sea FM Burnie
 Sea FM Cairns
 Sea FM Central Coast
 Sea FM Central Queensland
 C FM Darling Downs
 Sea FM Devonport
 Sea FM Gold Coast
 Sea FM Hobart
 Sea FM Mackay
 Sea FM Sunshine Coast
 Sea FM Townsville
 Sea FM Warragul
 Sea FM Wide Bay

References

Radio broadcasting companies of Australia
Companies formerly listed on the Australian Securities Exchange
Companies established in 1995
Companies disestablished in 2004
Defunct broadcasting companies of Australia